Guatemala is divided in 22 departments that are organized in 8 development regions declared by the Guatemalan government.

Official regions

Region I or Metropolitan

 Guatemala

Region II or North

 Alta Verapaz
 Baja Verapaz

Region III or Northeast

 Chiquimula
 El Progreso
 Izabal
 Zacapa

Region IV or Southeast

 Jutiapa
 Jalapa
 Santa Rosa

Region V or Central

 Chimaltenango
 Sacatepéquez
 Escuintla

Region VI or Southwest

 Quetzaltenango
 Retalhuleu
 San Marcos
 Suchitepéquez
 Sololá
 Totonicapán

Region VII or Northwest

 Huehuetenango
 Quiché

Region VIII or Petén

 Petén

References

Guatemala geography-related lists
Guatemala